Robert Lloyd (1733–1764) was an English poet and satirist.

Lloyd was educated at Westminster School and  Trinity College, Cambridge, graduating B.A. in 1755 and M.A. in 1758. He was author of the popular poem The Actor (1760) and the comic opera The Capricious Lovers (1764), first performed at Drury Lane just a few weeks before his death. He was co-author, with George Colman, of Ode to Obscurity and Ode to Oblivion, both published in the early 1760s, and both satires on the works of the poets William Mason and Thomas Gray. He was also co-editor of St James's Magazine (1762-3), and  member of the infamous Nonsense Club of Old Westminster men with Bonnell Thornton, George Colman, William Cowper and others.

Lloyd was often in debt, and apparently died in Fleet Prison on 15 December 1764, shortly after the death of his lifelong friend Charles Churchill, to whose sister, Patty, he was engaged.  Churchill's sister died shortly after. The Dictionary of National Biography says that Lloyd joined Charles Churchill in a "reckless career of dissipation", and Vulliamy, in his biography of James Boswell, wrote that  "Lloyd  died when he was thirty-one, ruined by his friendship with Churchill".


Works 

 To Obscurity (1760)
 To Oblivion (1760)
 Chit-Chat, an imitation of Theocritus
 The Capricious Lovers (1764)
 The Actor (1760)
 The Cit's Country Box (1757)
 Spirit of Contradiction

References

External links

Robert Lloyd at the Eighteenth-Century Poetry Archive (ECPA)
 Poems by Robert Lloyd, A.M., 1762

18th-century English poets
1733 births
1764 deaths
Alumni of Trinity College, Cambridge
People educated at Westminster School, London
Inmates of Fleet Prison
English male poets
People imprisoned for debt
18th-century English male writers